Funny Lady is a 1975 American biographical musical comedy-drama film and the sequel to the 1968 film Funny Girl. The film stars Barbra Streisand, James Caan, Omar Sharif, Roddy McDowall and Ben Vereen.

Herbert Ross, who helmed the musical sequences for Funny Girl, replaces William Wyler and the screenplay written by Jay Presson Allen and Arnold Schulman, based on a story by Schulman, is a highly fictionalized account of the later life and career of comedienne Fanny Brice and her marriage to songwriter and impresario Billy Rose. The primary score was by John Kander and Fred Ebb. The film was nominated for numerous awards including best actress for Streisand and best Actor for Cann. Streisand revisited the soundtrack to the film in her 2016 concert.

Plot

Cast
Barbra Streisand as Fanny Brice
James Caan as Billy Rose
Omar Sharif as Nick Arnstein
Roddy McDowall as Bobby Moore
Ben Vereen as Bert Robbins
Carole Wells as Norma Butler
Larry Gates as Bernard Baruch

Uncredited
Jack Angel as the voice of Radio Announcer

Production

Development
Although contractually bound to make one more film for producer Ray Stark (Fanny Brice's one-time son-in-law), Streisand balked at doing the project. She told Stark "that it would take litigation to make her do a sequel." However, Streisand liked the script, which showed Fanny to be "...tougher, more acerbic, more mature...", and she agreed.

Casting
The first to read for Billy Rose was Robert Blake. Other actors were mentioned, including Al Pacino and Robert De Niro, but ultimately James Caan was chosen. Streisand explained: "It comes down to whom the audience wants me to kiss. Robert Blake, no. James Caan, yes."

Filming
Stark, unhappy with the scenes shot by original cinematographer Vilmos Zsigmond, lured an ailing James Wong Howe out of retirement to complete the film. It proved to be his final project, and it earned him an Academy Award nomination.

Post-production
Studio executives forced Ross to trim the film to a manageable 136 minutes before release. Much of Vereen's performance ended up on the cutting room floor, together with a recreation of Brice's Baby Snooks radio show and dramatic scenes involving her and her daughter.

In addition to Howe, Oscar nominations went to Ray Aghayan and Bob Mackie for Best Costume Design, Kander and Ebb for Best Original Song ("How Lucky Can You Get?"), Peter Matz for Best Scoring of an Original Song Score and/or Adaptation, and the sound team. Streisand, Caan and Vereen all received Golden Globe Award nominations, as did Kander and Ebb and the film itself, but it was shut out of any wins in both competitions.

Release

Box office
Funny Lady opened Wednesday, March 12, 1975 and grossed $2,254,3851 in its first five days from 111 theatres to be number one at the US box office. It went on to gross $40,055,897 at the U.S. and Canadian box office, making it the seventh highest grossing picture of 1975. It was one of Caan's most successful films at the box office.

Critical reception
The film received mixed to negative reviews from critics. 

Vincent Canby of The New York Times wrote, "As long as Miss Streisand as Fanny is singing the blues, or singing anything else, Funny Lady is superb entertainment, but the minute she stops the movie turns into a concrete soufflé. It's heavy and tasteless ... Moments meant to be dramatic are embarrassingly bad."

Roger Ebert gave the film 1 star out of 4 and called it "a big, messy flop of a movie that's almost cruel in the way it invites our memories of Funny Girl and doesn't match them." Gene Siskel of the Chicago Tribune awarded 2.5 stars out of 4 and wrote, "It takes few chances and delivers mostly what you'd expect ... What was missing, for me at least, was a sense of surprise, of unpredictability—the sort of wit or pacing that separates a memorable musical like Cabaret from the merely tuneful."

Pauline Kael of The New Yorker wrote, "Streisand is in beautiful voice, and her singing is terrific—too terrific. It's no longer singing, it's something else—that strident overdramatization that turns a song into a big number. The audience's attention is directed away from the music and onto the star's feat in charging it with false energy. Streisand is out to knock you cold, and you get cold, all right." Kael also criticized the plot as "right out of those terrible forties movies in which couples who break up spend a lifetime thinking about each other, with encounters every five or ten years. And we get a double load of it here, with two graying ex-husbands."

Arthur D. Murphy of Variety wrote, "Barbra Streisand was outstanding as the younger Fanny Brice in Funny Girl, and in Funny Lady she's even better ... However much of a letdown the plot becomes, there's no denying the superior integration of drama, comedy, show music and personal dramatic music en route."

Charles Champlin of the Los Angeles Times wrote, "Barbra Streisand, like the picture, extends the characterization she launched so dazzlingly in Funny Girl ... What I find most impressive and likable about the performance is the softened, bittersweet maturity that Streisand lets us see in Fanny Brice. You sense that Streisand understands the star as well as she understood the impetuous young hopeful. An extraordinary presentation is the power and delight of both movies." Gary Arnold of The Washington Post called it a "lavish but uninspired" film that "seems to be celebrating stardom for stardom's sake. It's a joyless, mechanical Big Movie Musical."

Caan thought there were "too many cooks messing around", although he liked his performance.

Awards and nominations

Soundtrack

The soundtrack peaked on the Billboard Album Chart at number 6 and was certified gold. A majority of the songs were written by Kander and Ebb.

See also
 List of American films of 1975

References

Bibliography
Nickens, Christopher and Swenson, Karen (2001). The Films of Barbra Streisand, Citadel Press, 
Waldman, Allison J. (2001). The Barbra Streisand Scrapbook, Citadel Press,

External links

Barbra Archives Page on Funny Lady film, including cut scenes 
Barbra Archives: "Funny Lady" Soundtrack page 

1975 films
1975 musicals
1970s musical films
American musical films
American biographical films
American sequel films
Columbia Pictures films
1970s English-language films
Films about musical theatre
Films directed by Herbert Ross
Films set in New York City
Films set in the 1930s
Films set in the 1940s
Musical films based on actual events
1970s American films